Somerset West and Taunton is a local government district in Somerset, England. It was established on 1 April 2019 by the Somerset West and Taunton (Local Government Changes) Order 2018. The council replaced the Taunton Deane and West Somerset councils, which governed the same area from 1974.

On 1 April 2023, the district will itself be abolished and replaced by a new unitary district for the area at present served by Somerset County Council. The new council will be known as Somerset Council, covering Somerset district.

Background 
In September 2016, West Somerset and Taunton Deane councils agreed in principle to merge the districts into a single one, subject to consultation. The new district is not a unitary authority, with Somerset County Council still performing its functions at county level. In March 2018 both councils voted in favour of the merger and it came into effect on 1 April 2019, with the first elections to the new council in May 2019.

The new council was approved by James Brokenshire the Secretary of State for Housing, Communities and Local Government on 30 May 2018. The merger is expected to save £3.1 million each year.

According to figures released by the Office for National Statistics in 2009, the population of West Somerset has the oldest average age in the United Kingdom at 52. The largest centres of population are the coastal towns of Minehead (population 10,000) and Watchet (4,400).

Taunton Deane was based in Taunton. The district was formed on 1 April 1974, under the Local Government Act 1972, by a merger of the Municipal Borough of Taunton, Wellington Urban District, Taunton Rural District, and Wellington Rural District. Taunton Deane was granted borough status in 1975, perpetuating the mayoralty of Taunton. Taunton Deane includes the town of Wellington and surrounding villages.  Taunton Deane had an estimated population of 102,600 in 2001.

Governance 

The Conservative Party held a majority on the new council following the merger of Taunton Deane and West Somerset districts on 1 April 2019. This majority was inherited from their seat totals on the predecessor councils rather than the result of a direct election to the council. Inaugural elections to the council were held on 2 May 2019 which saw the Lib Dems gain control of the council. The current composition of the council is the following (note 1 seat is currently vacant pending a by-election):

Abolition
On 1 April 2023, the council will be abolished and replaced by a new unitary authority for the area at present served by Somerset County Council.  The new council will be known as Somerset Council.
Elections for the new council took place in May 2022, and it now will run alongside Sedgemoor and the other councils until their abolition in April 2023.

See also
2019 structural changes to local government in England

References

External links
Somerset West and Taunton Shadow Authority

 
Non-metropolitan districts of Somerset
2019 establishments in England